Mondaino is a comune (municipality) in the Province of Rimini in the Italian region Emilia-Romagna, located about  southeast of Bologna and approximately  southeast of Rimini.

Mondaino borders the following municipalities: Montecalvo in Foglia, Montefiore Conca, Montegridolfo, Saludecio, Tavoleto, Tavullia, Urbino.

References

External links
 Official website 

Cities and towns in Emilia-Romagna